ROBUSTA-1B (Radiation on Bipolar Test for University Satellite Application) is a nano-satellite (Cubesat) scientific experiment developed by the University of Montpellier students, a successor to the ROBUSTA satellite, which was launched in February 2012 and lost soon after.

ROBUSTA-1B carries an updated version of the ROBUSTA payload, an experiment to check the deterioration of electronic components based on bipolar transistors, when exposed to in-flight space radiation. The results of the experiment will be used to validate a new radiation test method proposed by the laboratory.

ROBUSTA Comparison 
Started as a simple reflight of ROBUSTA, the project quickly became a complete upgrade of most of the satellite's systems, using the feedback provided by the previous project.

References 

Student satellites
CubeSats
Spacecraft launched in 2017